The  are film-specific prizes awarded solely by the Tokyo Sports.

Categories
There are following categories:
Best Film
Best Actor
Best Actress
Best Supporting Actor
Best Supporting Actress
Best Director
Best Newcomer
Best Foreign Film
Special Award
Special Film Award

See also 
Japanese Adult Video Awards

External links
 List of awards on Tokyo Sports 
 List of awards on Tokyo Sports 

1991 establishments in Japan
Awards established in 1991
Japanese film awards
Recurring events established in 1991